Marcala Fútbol Club is a Honduran football club, based in Marcala, Honduras.

The club currently plays in Liga de Ascenso de Honduras.

References

Marcala